Sir Francis Wortley, 1st Baronet (1591–1652), poet and politician who sat in the House of Commons between 1624 and 1626. He supported the Royalist cause in the English Civil War.

Life
Wortley was the son of Sir Richard Wortley, of Wortley Hall, Yorkshire and his wife Elizabeth Boughton daughter of Edward Boughton, of Cawston, Warwickshire (afterwards Countess of Devonshire). He succeeded his father in the family estates on 25 July 1603. He matriculated at  Magdalen College, Oxford on 17 February 1609, aged 17. He was knighted at Theobald's on 15 January 1611 and was created a baronet on 29 June 1611. He was admitted to Gray's Inn on 1 August 1624. In 1624, he was elected Member of Parliament for East Retford in the Happy Parliament. He was re-elected MP for East Retford in 1625 and 1626.

Wortley was a devoted supporter of the Royalist cause during the Civil Wars. At the outbreak of war on 22 August 1642, Wortley was one of four chief baronets chosen to raise the king's standard at Nottingham, effectively beginning the raising of the king's army.

He raised a troop of horse and  fortified his house at Wortley. He supported Charles II in the Siege of Hull (1642). He was captured in 1644 at Wotton House, near Wakefield and imprisoned in the Tower of London from 1644 to 1648. His estates were sequestrated and he was fined £500 on 24 April 1647. While in prison he published Characters and Elegies in 1646, and some other works. He was a friend of Ben Jonson, and contributed to Jonsonus Virbius, in 1638.

Wortley died in 1653 and directed that he be buried with his father at Windsor.

Family
Wortley married firstly, Grace Brouncker, daughter of Sir William Brouncker of Melskaham, Wiltshire. He married secondly, after 1623 (her first husband died in 1624), Hester Eyre, widow of Christopher Eyre Alderman of London, and daughter of George Smithes, Alderman and  Sheriff of London. He was succeeded in the baronetcy by his son Francis.

References

Attribution

Further reading
Gatty, Alfred,(1860). Wortley & the Wortleys : a lecture delivered before the Sheffield Literary and Philosophical Society, also the Rotherham Literary and Scientific Society,Talbot Collection of British Pamphlets, Thomas Rodgers, Change Alley Corner

1591 births
1652 deaths
Baronets in the Baronetage of England
English MPs 1624–1625
English MPs 1625
English MPs 1626
17th-century English poets
17th-century male writers
People from Barnsley
Cavaliers
Prisoners in the Tower of London
Politicians from Yorkshire